Italian Somaliland was a protectorate and later colony of the Kingdom of Italy in present-day Somalia. Ruled in the 19th century by the Somali Sultanates of Hobyo and Majeerteen in the north, and the Hiraab Imamate and Geledi Sultanate  and the Biimaal Sultanate leading a resistance against the colonials in southern Somalia for decades. The territory was acquired in the 1880s by Italy through various treaties.

In 1936, the region was integrated into Italian East Africa as the Somalia Governorate. This would last until Italy's loss of the region in 1941, during the East African campaign of World War II. Italian Somalia then came under British military administration until 1950, when it became a United Nations trusteeship, the Trust Territory of Somalia under Italian administration. On 1 July 1960, the Trust Territory of Somalia united in agreement with the former British Somaliland protectorate to form the Somali Republic.

History
The late 19th century had a huge impact in the Horn of Africa. The Somali Sultans that then controlled the region, such as Yusuf Ali Kenadid, Boqor Osman Mahamuud, Ahmed Yusuf, and Olol Dinle entered into treaties with one of the European colonial powers Great Britain, and France or Abyssinia.

First settlement

At the end of the 19th century, a growing social-political movement developed within Italy to start expanding its influence, since many other European countries had already been doing so, which was effectively leaving Italy behind.  Italy also had serious economic problems. It is also argued by some historians that Italy had a minor interest in the mutton and livestock that were then plentiful in Somalia, though whatever designs Italy may have had on the resource-challenged Somali landscape were undoubtedly subordinate to its interest in the region's ports and the waters and lands to which they provided access.

Cesare Correnti organized an expedition under the Società Geografica Italiana in 1876. The next year, the travel journal L’Esploratore was established by Manfredo Camperio. The "Società di Esplorazioni Commerciali in Africa" was created in 1879, with the Italian industrial establishment involved as well. The "Club Africano", which three years later became the "Società Africana D’Italia", was also established in Somalia in 1880.

Majeerteen-Italian treaties

In late 1888, Sultan Yusuf Ali Kenadid entered into a treaty with Italy, making his Sultanate of Hobyo an Italian protectorate. His rival Boqor Osman Mahamuud was to sign a similar agreement vis-a-vis his own Majeerteen Sultanate (Majeerteenia) the following year. Both rulers had entered into the protectorate treaties to advance their own expansionist goals, with Sultan Kenadid looking to use Italy's support in his ongoing power struggle with Boqor Osman over the Majeerteen Sultanate, as well as in a separate conflict with the Hiraab Sultanate over an area to the south of Hobyo. In signing the agreements, the rulers also hoped to exploit the rival objectives of the European imperial powers so as to more effectively assure the continued independence of their territories. The Italians, for their part, were interested in the largely arid territory mainly because of its ports, which could grant them access to the strategically important Suez Canal and the Gulf of Aden.

The terms of each treaty specified that Italy was to steer clear of any interference in the Sultanates' respective administrations. In return for Italian arms and an annual subsidy, the Sultans conceded to a minimum of oversight and economic concessions. The Italians also agreed to dispatch a few ambassadors to promote both the Sultanates' and their own interests. The new protectorates were thereafter managed by Vincenzo Filonardi through a chartered company. An Anglo-Italian border protocol was later signed on 5 May 1894, followed by an agreement in 1906 between Cavalier Pestalozza and General Swaine acknowledging that Baran fell under the Majeerteen Sultanate's administration.

The last piece of land acquired by Italy in Somalia in order to form Italian Somaliland was the Jubaland region. Britain ceded the territory in 1925 as a reward for the Italians having joined the Allies in World War I. The British retained control of the southern half of the partitioned Jubaland territory, which was later called the Northern Frontier District (NFD).

Italo-Abyssinian campaign

In January 1887 Italian troops from Somalia fought a battle against Ras Alula Engida's militia in Dogali, Eritrea, where they lost 500 troops. The Prime Minister, Agostino Depretis, died shortly after this defeat in July 1887. Francesco Crispi replaced him as Prime Minister. On 2 May 1889, the Ethiopian Emperor Menelik II and Italy signed a peace treaty.

Coastal settlement

Italy gained control of the ports of the Benadir coastal area with the concession of a small strip of land on the coast from the Sultan of Zanzibar, and over the following decades, Italian settlement was encouraged. In 1905, Italy assumed the responsibility of creating a colony in southern Somalia, after several failed attempts. This followed revelations that the Benadir Company had tolerated or collaborated in the perpetuation of the slave trade. The administrative regulator was Governor Mercantelli, with the six subdivisions of Brava, Merca, Lugh, Itala, Bardera, and Jumbo.

On 5 April 1908, the Italian Parliament enacted a basic law to unite all of the parts of southern Somalia into an area called "Somalia Italiana". The colonial power was then divided between the Parliament, the metropolitan government, and the colonial government. The power of the colonial government was the only power that was changed. The civil governor controlled export rights, regulated the rate of exchange, raised or lowered native taxes, and administered all civil services and matters relating to hunting, fishing, and conservation. The governor was in control of the police force, while nominating local residents and military arrangements.

From 5 April 1908 to 5 May 1936, the Royal Corps of Somali Colonial Troops (Regio corpo truppe coloniali della Somalia Italiana), originally called the "Guard Corps of Benadir", served as the territory's formal military corps. At the start of its establishment, the force had 2,600 Italian officers. Between 1911 and 1912, over 1,000 Somalis from Mogadishu served as combat units along with Eritrean and Italian soldiers in the Italo-Turkish War. Most of the troops stationed never returned home until they were transferred back to Italian Somaliland in preparation for the invasion of Ethiopia in 1935.

Effective Italian control remained largely limited to the coastal areas until the early 1920s. After the collapse of the Dervish movement, wherein Diiriye Guure was sultan and wherein Mohammed Abdullah Hassan' was emir, rebellion and revolt occurred, with disputes arising between different clans in the colony. The government of the time served as a mediator while maintaining close control over the military.

Colonial development and fascist era

In 1920, a member of the Italian Royal Family, The Duca degli Abruzzi, who was also a famous explorer, would establish the Società Agricola Italo-Somala (SAIS) in order to explore the agricultural potential of the territory. That same year, the Duca founded the Villaggio Duca degli Abruzzi ("Villabruzzi"; Jowhar) as an agricultural settlement in Italian Somaliland. The area produced sugar, bananas and cotton. On 5 December 1923, Cesare Maria De Vecchi di Val Cismon was named Governor in charge of the new colonial administration.

In November 1920, the Banca d'Italia, the first modern bank in Italian Somaliland, was established in Mogadishu.

After World War I in 1925, Trans-Juba, which was then a part of British East Africa, was ceded to Italy. This concession was purportedly a reward for the Italians having joined the Allies in World War I.

Following an examination of the layout of the land, the Italians began new local infrastructure projects, including the construction of hospitals, farms and schools.

The relationship between the Sultanate of Hobyo and Italy soured when Sultan Kenadid refused the Italians' proposal to allow a British contingent of troops to disembark in his Sultanate so that they might then pursue their battle against the Somali religious and nationalist leader Muhammad Abdullah Hassan's Dervish forces. Viewed as too much of a threat, Sultan Kenadid was eventually exiled to Aden in Yemen and then to Eritrea. His son Ali Yusuf Kenadid succeeded him on the throne. In 1924, Governor Cesare Maria De Vecchi adopted a policy of disarmentation of the northern Somali sultanates. Sultan Ali Yusuf Kenadid was thereafter in turn exiled. The Dubats colonial troops and the Zaptié gendarmerie were extensively used by De Vecchi during these military campaigns. However, unlike the southern territories, the northern sultanates were not subject to direct rule due to the earlier treaties they had signed with the Italians.

In 1926, the agricultural colony of Villaggio Duca degli Abruzzi comprised 16 villages, with some 3,000 Somali and 200 Italian inhabitants, and was connected by a 114 km new railway to Mogadishu. Italian colonial policy followed two principles in Italian Somaliland: preservation of the dominant clan and ethnic configurations and respect for Islam as the territory's religion.

In 1928, the Italian authorities built the Mogadishu Cathedral (Cattedrale di Mogadiscio). It was constructed in a Norman Gothic style, based on the Cefalù Cathedral in Cefalù, Sicily. Following its establishment, Crown Prince Umberto II made his first publicized visit to Mogadishu. To commemorate the visit, the Arch of Umberto was constructed. The arch was built at the center of Mogadishu Garden. The Mogadishu International Airport was constructed that same year. The facility was regarded as one of the finest in the region.

In the early 1930s, the new Italian Governors, Guido Corni and Maurizio Rava, started a policy of assimilation of the Somalis. Many Somalis were enrolled in the Italian colonial troops, and thousands of Italian colonists moved to live in Mogadishu. The city grew in size and some small manufacturing companies opened up. The Italians also settled in agricultural areas around the capital, such as Jowhar and Janale (Genale).

In 1930, there were 22,000 Italians living in Italian Somaliland, representing 2% of the territory's population. The majority resided in the capital Mogadishu, with other Italian communities concentrated in Jowhar, Adale (Itala), Janale, Jamame and Kismayo.

In October 1934, Crown Prince Umberto II made his second publicized visit to Italian Somaliland. King Victor Emmanuel III would also travel to the territory, arriving on 3 November that same year, accompanied by Emilio de Bono, after a non-stop flight from Rome. They were welcomed by the Governor Maurizio Rava and other colonial administrators. The King then traveled to Villabruzzi on 5 November and then returned to Mogadishu, where he celebrated his 65th birthday on 11 November. Following his visit to Italian Somaliland, new maps and 14 stamps were published. To commemorate his visit, an Arch of Triumph was constructed in Mogadishu in 1934.

Italian East Africa (1936–1941)

By 1935, Mogadishu began to serve as a major naval base and port for the Italians. Then Prime Minister of Italy Benito Mussolini regarded Greater Somalia (La Grande Somalia) as the crown jewel in Italy's colonial empire on the continent. He viewed himself less as an invader than as a liberator of the occupied Somali territories, including the Ogaden region, to which the Ethiopian Empire laid claim. On this basis, he justified his plan to invade Ethiopia. In October 1935, the southern front of the Second Italo-Abyssinian War was launched into Ethiopia from Italian Somaliland. The Italian General Rodolfo Graziani commanded the invasion forces in the south. Over 40,000 Somali troops served in the war, mostly as combat units. They backed up the over 80,000 Italians serving alongside them at the start of the offensive. Many of the Somalis were veterans from serving in Italian Libya. During the invasion of Ethiopia, Mogadishu served as a chief supply base.

In June 1936, after the war ended, Italian Somaliland became part of Italian East Africa (Africa Orientale Italiana) forming the Somalia Governorate. The new colony of the Italian Empire also included Ethiopia and Eritrea. To commemorate the victory, an Arch of Triumph was constructed in Mogadishu.

From 1936 to 1940, new roads were constructed in the region, such as the "Imperial Road" from Mogadishu to Addis Ababa. New railways (114 km from Mogadishu to Jowhar) and many schools, hospitals, ports and bridges were also built.

Since the start of the colony, many Somali troops fought in the so-called Regio Corpo Truppe Coloniali. The soldiers were enrolled as Dubats, Zaptié and Bande irregolari. During World War II, these troops were regarded as a wing of the Italian Army's Infantry Division, as was the case in Libya and Eritrea. The Zaptié were considered the best: they provided a ceremonial escort for the Italian Viceroy (Governor) as well as the territorial police. There were already more than one thousand such soldiers in 1922. In 1941, in Italian Somaliland and Ethiopia, 2,186 Zaptìé plus an additional 500 recruits under training officially constituted a part of the Carabinieri. They were organised into a battalion commanded by Major Alfredo Serranti that defended Culqualber (Ethiopia) for three months until this military unit was destroyed by the Allies. After heavy fighting, all the Italian Carabinieri, including the Somali troops, received full military honors from the British.

In 1935, there were over 50,000 Italians settlers living in Italian Somaliland, constituting 5% of the territory's population. Of those, 20,000 resided in Mogadishu (Mogadiscio), representing around 40% of the city's 50,000 residents.  Mogadishu was an administrative capital of Italian East Africa, and new buildings were erected in the Italian architectural tradition. Other Italian settler communities were concentrated in Jowhar, Adale (Itala), Janale, Jamame, and Kismayo. These figures do not include the more than 220,000 Italian soldiers stationed throughout Italian Somaliland during the Second Italo-Ethiopian War.

The colony was also one of the most developed in Africa in terms of the standard of living of the colonists and of the local inhabitants, mainly in the urban areas. By 1940, the Villaggio Duca degli Abruzzi ("Villabruzzi"; Jowhar) had a population of 12,000 people, of whom nearly 3,000 were Italian Somalis, and enjoyed a notable level of development with a small manufacturing area with agricultural industries (sugar mills, etc.).

In the second half of 1940, Italian troops invaded British Somaliland, and ejected the British. The Italians also occupied Kenyan areas bordering Jubaland around the villages of Moyale and Buna. Although the Italian leadership believed were unsure where the British army would land first, Operation Canvas, to capture southern Somalia occurred first in January 1941, whereas the subsequent attempt to capture British Somaliland happened two months later in Operation Appearance.

In the spring of 1941, Britain regained control of British Somaliland and conquered Italian Somaliland with the Ogaden. However, until the summer of 1943, there was an Italian guerrilla war in all the areas of the former Italian East Africa.

British Military Administration (1941–1950)

British forces occupied Italian Somaliland and militarily administered the territory as well as British Somaliland. Faced with growing Italian political pressure inimical to continued British tenure and Somali aspirations for independence, the Somalis and the British came to see each other as allies. The first modern Somali political party, the Somali Youth Club (SYC), was subsequently established in Mogadishu in 1943; it was later renamed the Somali Youth League (SYL). The SYL evolved into the dominant party and had a moderate ideology. Hizbia Digil Mirifle Somali (HDMS) party served as the principal opposition to the right, although its platform was generally in agreement with that of the SYL.

In November 1949, the United Nations finally opted to grant Italy trusteeship of Italian Somaliland, but only under close supervision and on the condition — first proposed by the Somali Youth League (SYL) and other nascent Somali political organizations, such as Hizbia Digil Mirifle Somali (later Hizbia Dastur Mustaqbal Somali, or HDMS) and the Somali National League (SNL), that were then agitating for independence — that Somalia achieve independence within ten years.

Trust Territory of Somalia (1950–1960)

In 1949, when the British military administration ended, Italian Somaliland became a United Nations trusteeship known as the Trust Territory of Somaliland. Under Italian administration, this trust territory lasted ten years, from 1950 to 1960, with legislative elections held in 1956 and 1959.

During the 1950s, with UN funds pouring in and the presence of experienced Italian administrators who had come to see the region as their home, infrastructural and educational development blossomed in the region. School enrollment during this period was free. The decade passed relatively without incident, and was marked by positive growth in virtually all aspects of local life.

In the 1956 parliamentary election, the Somali Youth League would win 54.29% of votes versus 26.01% for the nearest party, the Hizbia Digil Mirifle Somali. The SYL would also earn 416 of the 663 seats in the 1958 municipal election, with the HDMS securing 175 seats. By the 1959 parliamentary election, SYL would capture an even greater share of votes by winning 75.58% of the total ballot.

Italian was an official language in Italian Somaliland during the Fiduciary Mandate, as well as in the first years of independence. By 1952, the majority of Somalis had some understanding of the language. In 1954, the Italian government established post-secondary institutions of law, economics and social studies in Mogadishu, the territory's capital. These institutions were satellites of the University of Rome, which provided all the instruction material, faculty and administration.

Independence (1960)

On 1 July 1960, the Trust Territory of Somaliland (the former Italian Somaliland) and the former British Somaliland united to form the Somali Republic (Somalia), with Mogadishu as the nation's capital.

A government was formed by Abdullahi Issa and Muhammad Haji Ibrahim Egal and other members of the trusteeship and protectorate governments, with Abdulcadir Muhammed Aden as President of the Somali National Assembly, Aden Abdullah Osman Daar as President of the Somali Republic, and Abdirashid Ali Shermarke as Prime Minister (later to become president from 1967 to 1969). On 20 July 1961 and through a popular referendum, the people of Somalia ratified a new constitution, which was first drafted in 1960.

Governors

See also
 Italian Somalis
 Italian Eritrea
 Italian Libya

References

Further reading

 Antonicelli, Franco. Trent'anni di storia italiana 1915 - 1945. Mondadori Editore. Torino, 1961.
 
 
 Fitzgerald, Nina J. Somalia. Nova Science, Inc. New York, 2002.
 Hess, Robert L. Italian Colonialism in Somalia. University of Chicago P. Chicago, 1966.
 
 Tripodi, Paolo. The Colonial Legacy in Somalia. St. Martin's P Inc. New York, 1999.

External links

 "La Somalia Italiana", written in 1925 by Romolo Onor (in Italian).
 "Atlante delle colonie italiane". Detailed Atlas of Italian colonies, written by Baratta Mario and Visintin Luigi in 1928 (in Italian).
 Border changes between Ethiopia and "Somalia Italiana"in the 1930s
 Collection of photos of "Somalia italiana" (1885-1960)

 
Somaliland
1941 disestablishments in Africa
Former Italian-speaking countries
Former colonies in Africa
Somaliland
Italy–Somalia relations
States and territories established in 1889
1889 establishments in Somalia
1889 establishments in the Italian Empire
1936 disestablishments in the Italian Empire
Former countries of the interwar period